Tip of the iceberg may refer to:
 Tip of the iceberg, the top tenth portion of an iceberg, which floats above the water's surface
 The idiom, "Tip of the iceberg", meaning the portion of something that is immediately apparent, which obscures the complexity (i.e. the underwater portion of the iceberg) of the subject being discussed.

Music
 Tip of the Iceberg (EP), an EP by New Found Glory
 Tip of the Iceberg, an album by MC Juice
 Tip of the Iceberg, a 1993 album by Greater Than One
 "The Tip of the Iceberg", a song on the 2009 Owl City album Ocean Eyes